Eugène Arnold Dolmetsch (24 February 1858 – 28 February 1940), was a French-born musician and instrument maker who spent much of his working life in England and established an instrument-making workshop in Haslemere, Surrey. He was a leading figure in the 20th-century revival of interest in early music.

Early life

The Dolmetsch family was originally of Bohemian origin, but (Eugène) Arnold Dolmetsch, the son of Rudolph Arnold Dolmetsch and his wife Marie Zélie (née Guillouard) was born at Le Mans, France, where the family had established a piano-making business. It was in the family's workshops that Dolmetsch acquired the skills of instrument-making that would later be put to use in his early music workshops.

He studied music at the Brussels Conservatoire and learnt the violin with Henri Vieuxtemps. In 1883 he travelled to London to attend the Royal College of Music, where he studied under Henry Holmes and Frederick Bridge, and was awarded a Bachelor of Music degree in 1889.

The early music revival

Dolmetsch was employed for a short time as a music teacher at Dulwich College, but his interest in early instruments was awakened by seeing the collections of historic instruments in the British Museum. After constructing his first reproduction of a lute in 1893, he began building keyboard instruments. William Morris encouraged him to build his first harpsichord. He left England to build clavichords and harpsichords for Chickering of Boston (1905–1911), then for Gaveau of Paris (1911–1914).

During Dolmetsch's time at Chickering, he resided in a house in Cambridge, Massachusetts, partially of his own design, with the aid of architects Luquer and Godfrey. It was through Dolmetsch's work in Cambridge that a wealthy benefactress, Miss Belle Skinner, was able to restore a number of rare instruments, including a spinet owned by Marie Antoinette, which today comprise the founding collection of Yale's Collection of Musical Instruments.

He went on to establish an instrument-making workshop in Haslemere, Surrey, and proceeded to build copies of almost every kind of instrument dating from the 15th to 18th centuries, including viols, lutes, recorders and a range of keyboard instruments. His 1915 book The Interpretation of the Music of the XVIIth and XVIIIth Centuries was a milestone in the development of 'authentic performances' of early music.

In 1925 he founded an annual chamber music festival, the International Dolmetsch Early Music Festival, which is held every July at Haslemere in the Haslemere Hall.

Dolmetsch settled in Dulwich (at 'Dowlands', 172 Rosendale Road) and was active in the cultural life of London. His friends and admirers included William Morris, Selwyn Image, Roger Fry, Gabriele D'Annunzio, George Bernard Shaw, Marco Pallis, Ezra Pound, George Moore, whose novel Evelyn Innes celebrates Dolmetsch's life and work, and W. B. Yeats.

He was responsible for rediscovering the school of English composers for viol consort (including John Jenkins and William Lawes), leading to Sir Henry Hadow's tribute that Dolmetsch had "opened the door to a forgotten treasure-house of beauty". He was also largely responsible for the revival of the recorder, both as a serious concert instrument, and as an instrument which made early music accessible to amateur performers. He went on to promote the recorder as an instrument for teaching music in schools.

In 1937 he received a British Civil list pension and in 1938 he was created a chevalier of the Légion d'honneur by the French government.

Dolmetsch family

Arnold Dolmetsch was married three times. On 28 May 1878 he married Marie Morel of Namur, Belgium (a widow, ten years his senior) but was divorced in 1898. His second wife, to whom he was married on 11 September 1899, in Zürich, was Elodie Désirée, the divorced wife of his brother. This marriage ended in divorce in 1903. Thirdly, he was married on 23 September 1903 to Mabel Johnston, one of his pupils.

Dolmetsch encouraged the members of his family to learn the skills of instrument-making and musicianship and the family frequently appeared together in concerts, playing instruments constructed in the Dolmetsch workshops. Following the death of Arnold Dolmetsch at Haslemere in 1940, his family continued to promote the building and playing of early instruments.

 Mabel Dolmetsch (1874-1963), his third wife, was a noted player of the bass viol. She wrote "Dances of England and France 1450 - 1600" which includes tunes set by Arnold Dolmetsch.
 Cécile Dolmetsch (1904-1997), his daughter, was a soprano and specialist of the pardessus de viole.
 Nathalie Dolmetsch (31 July 190514 Feb 1989), his daughter, was born in Chicago to Dolmetsch and his wife Mabel. Nathalie continued her mother's tradition of early dancing and specialised in playing the viola de gamba. She founded the Viola da Gamba Society in 1948 and edited music and wrote on the viols. Her publications include Twelve Lessons on the Viola da Gamba, with Advice by Christopher Simpson (1659), Thomas Mace (1676), Marin Marais (1686), Jean Rousseau (1687), and Hubert Le Blanc (1740) (Schott & Co., London, 1950), and The Viola da Gamba: its Origin and History, its Technique and Musical Resources (Hinrichsen, London, 1962, Hinrichsen No. 759).
 Rudolph Dolmetsch (1906-1942), his son, was a gifted keyboard player, gamba player, and composer, who died in the sinking of the SS Ceramic in 1942. His Concerto for clarinet, harp and orchestra (1939) was revived and recorded in 2020.
 Carl Dolmetsch (1911-1997), his son, was a noted recorder player and took over his father's instrument-making business.

See also
 List of historical harpsichord makers
 John Challis (harpsichord), apprentice of Dolmetsch whose instruments gradually incorporated modern mechanics with traditional construction

References

 H. C. G. Matthews and Brian Harrison (editors): The Oxford Dictionary of National Biography, Oxford University Press, 2004. 
 Percy Scholes: The Oxford Companion to Music, 10th edition, Oxford University Press, 1970

External links 
 The Dolmetsch Story at dolmetsch online, accessed 2 March 2005
 The Dolmetsch Historical Dance Society, founded 1970 in memory of Mabel Dolmetsch
 

1858 births
1940 deaths
People from Le Mans
19th-century French male classical violinists
British classical musicians
French multi-instrumentalists
French recorder players
British multi-instrumentalists
French performers of early music
Chevaliers of the Légion d'honneur
Alumni of the Royal College of Music
Royal Conservatory of Brussels alumni
French people of German descent
French expatriates in Belgium
French expatriates in the United Kingdom
British performers of early music
Recorder makers